P3 is an RGB color space. DCI-P3 (Digital Cinema Initiative) is used with digital theatrical motion picture distribution (DCDM). Display P3 is a variant developed by Apple Inc. for wide-gamut displays.



History

Development of the standard
In 2005, Digital Cinema Initiatives, LCC in Hollywood, California released the Digital Cinema System Specification version 1.0, which defined the colorimetry of what would become known as the DCI-P3 color space. 

According to section 8.3.4 in the specification, the blue primary color is the same as Rec. 709, sRGB, and Adobe RGB, with a dominant wavelength of 464.2 nm. The red primary is a slightly deeper red than sRGB and Adobe RGB, with a dominant wavelength of 614.9 nm.

The most significant difference is the green primary which is much closer to the spectral locus than either sRGB or Adobe RGB. DCI-P3's green primary has a dominant wavelength of 544.2 nm. Adobe RGB's green primary is more blueish with a dominant wavelength of 534.7 nm. sRGB's green primary is more yellowish at 549.1 nm.

DCI-P3 covers 45.5% of the CIE 1931 chromaticity diagram (see inset image), which describes the color gamut of daylight human vision (Photopic vision) as determined experimentally in the 1920s. In that study, participants visually matched a mixture of red, green, and blue "primary" lights to specific, pure monochromatic colored lights. This defined the spectral locus, which is the outer rim of the diagram, and the maximum extent of human color vision.

A more practical gamut is that of reflected surface colors which is described by Pointer's gamut. In this case, DCI-P3 covers 86.9% of Pointer's gamut. Rec.709/sRGB only covers 69.4%.

While DCI-P3 was developed by the Digital Cinema Initiatives (DCI) organization, many of the relevant technical standards are published by the Society of Motion Picture and Television Engineers (SMPTE) such as SMPTE EG 432-1 and SMPTE RP 431-2.

On November 10, 2010, SMPTE published SMPTE EG 432-1:2010, which includes a variant of the color space using a D65 white point (about 6503.51 K) instead of the ~6300 K white point of DCI-P3.

On April 6, 2011, SMPTE published SMPTE RP 431-2:2011 which defines the reference viewing environment.

DCI-P3 colors are supported in CSS on Safari since 2017 (version 10.1) and Google Chrome since March 2013 (version 111) browsers.

Display technology 
Initially, DCI-P3 was available with theatrical xenon-arc projection systems. This emerging technology presented challenges for filmmakers working with digital media on desktop workstations—that is, how to accurately view the colorspace of the theatrical viewing environment during the production and post production process.

In 2008, HP released the first "HP DreamColor" monitor which could display 97% of DCI-P3 color space.

In 2014, Eizo introduced the first professional 4K monitor with support of the P3 color space.

In 2015, Apple's iMac desktop became the first consumer computer with a built-in wide-gamut display, supporting the P3 color space. Apple's implementation, known as Display P3, uses a D65 white point, and uses the sRGB TRC (sometimes referred to as gamma).

In 2016, the UHD Alliance announced their specifications for Ultra HD Premium which requires devices to display at least 90% of the DCI-P3 color space (in area, not volume).

Also in 2016, Apple, Samsung, and Microsoft released mobile and desktop devices with P3 support.

P3 colorimetry 

DCI-P3 specifications are designed for viewing in a fully darkened theater environment. The projection system uses a simple 2.6 gamma curve, the nominal white luminance is 48 cd/m2 with the white point defined as a correlated color temperature of ~6300 K. It is incorrect to refer to this as "D63" as this white point is not a CIE standard illuminant, and is not on the Planckian locus. Instead, the white point is slightly greener. This resulted from optimizing for best light output with the xenon arc lamp projectors commonly used in theaters.

Display P3 is a color space created by Apple Inc. It uses the DCI-P3 primaries, but instead of the ~6300 K white point, Display P3 uses the CIE standard illuminant D65 as the white point, which is the most common standard for self-illuminated displays and devices (sRGB and Adobe RGB both use D65). Also, unlike the DCI-P3 projection gamma of 2.6, Display P3 uses the sRGB transfer curve, which is approximately equivalent to a display with a 2.2 gamma. Display P3's gamut is approximately 50% larger than sRGB in volume and 25% in surface.

Since iPhone 7, the built in camera creates images tagged with the Display P3 ICC profile.

P3-D65 with the PQ TRC is also used for some of Netflix deliverables, including HDR and without BT.2020 container, but later Netflix added BT.2020 primaries too. Red of P3 is slightly outside BT.2020 triangle.

DCI-P3+ and Cinema Gamut 

An expanded gamut known as the DCI-P3+ color space is also available, which in turn is a smaller version of the Cinema Gamut color space. DCI-P3+ uses the same ~6300 K white point as DCI-P3. Cinema Gamut is specified as having a D65 white point.

References 

Color space
Film and video technology
SMPTE standards
Ultra-high-definition television